Neoscopelus is a genus of blackchins.

Species
The currently recognized species in this genus are:
 Neoscopelus macrolepidotus J. Y. Johnson, 1863 (large-scaled lanternfish)
 Neoscopelus microchir Matsubara, 1943 (shortfin neoscopelid)
 Neoscopelus porosus R. Arai, 1969 (spangleside neoscopelid)

References

Myctophiformes
Taxa named by James Yate Johnson
Marine fish genera